Sawara may refer to:

Locations in Japan
Sawara-ku, Fukuoka
Sawara, Fukuoka
Sawara, Chiba
Sawara District, Fukuoka (:ja:早良郡), former administrative region in the Chikuzen Province

People
Sawara clan (:ja:佐原氏), an influential Japanese family
Megumi Sawara (:ja:早良めぐみ), a Japanese actress and fashion model
Morizumi Sawara (:ja:佐原盛純), a Japanese sinologist
Prince Sawara, (:ja:早良親王), a Japanese prince and son of Emperor Kōnin
Sawara no Kinsaburō (:ja:佐原喜三郎), a knight-errant from the Edo period
Tokusuke Sawara (:ja:佐原篤介), a journalist from the Meiji period

Other
Sawara Cypress, a species of coniferous tree
Japanese Spanish mackerel and Atlantic Spanish mackerel, two species of saltwater fish called "sawara" on sushi menus